The 2001 Tour de Romandie was the 55th edition of the Tour de Romandie cycle race and was held from 8 May to 13 May 2001. The race started in Pfaffnau and finished in Geneva. The race was won by Dario Frigo of the Fassa Bortolo team.

General classification

Doping cases
Sergio Barbero and Laurent Chotard tested positive for EPO during the 2001 Tour de Romandie.

References

2001
Tour de Romandie